The 1987–88 Ranji Trophy was the 54th season of the Ranji Trophy. Tamil Nadu defeated Railways by an innings in the final.

Group stage

North Zone

Central Zone

West Zone

South Zone

East Zone

Knockout stage 

(F) - Advanced to next round on First Innings Lead.
(T) - Advanced to next round on Coin Toss.
(Q) - Advanced to next round on better Quotient.

Final

Scorecards and averages
Cricketarchive

References

External links

1988 in Indian cricket
Domestic cricket competitions in 1987–88
Ranji Trophy seasons